The Knoxville News Sentinel, also known as Knox News, is a daily newspaper in Knoxville, Tennessee, United States, owned by the Gannett Company.

History
The newspaper was formed in 1926 from the merger of two competing newspapers: The Knoxville News and The Knoxville Sentinel.  John Trevis Hearn began publishing The Sentinel in December 1886, while The News was started in 1921 by Robert P. Scripps and Roy W. Howard. The two merged in 1926, with the first edition of The Knoxville News-Sentinel appearing on November 22 of that year. The editor from 1921 to 1931, Edward J. Meeman, later was sent to Memphis to edit the since defunct Memphis Press-Scimitar.

In 1986, the News-Sentinel became a morning paper, with the other paper in Knoxville, the Knoxville Journal, becoming an evening paper. The Journal ceased publication as a daily in 1991, when the joint operating agreement between the two papers expired. In 2002, the paper dropped the hyphen from its name to become the Knoxville News Sentinel.

In April 2016, the News Sentinel announced it had become part of Gannett, as a part of the USA Today Network. The News Sentinel was added to the nation's largest newspaper company with more than 200 local dailies and USA Today.

Management
Joel Christopher, formerly of Louisville Courier Journal, was appointed the executive editor at Knoxville News Sentinel in Jan. 2019.

Christopher's appointment came after the retirement of executive editor Jack McElroy  in early 2019. McElroy, formerly of the Rocky Mountain News served the News Sentinel as its top editor for 17 years.

Frank E Rosamond Sr. served as the newspaper's last president after leaving the company with McElroy in 2018.

Knox News
Knox News, the digital brand of the News Sentinel and Knoxnews.com, has won many national awards, including winning three 2008 Digital Edge Awards from the Newspaper Association of America for best overall news website, most innovative user-participation and best site design.

Spelling-bee sponsorships
The News Sentinel has sponsored four winners of the Scripps National Spelling Bee:
 1940:  Laura Kuykendall (now Laura Kuykendall Mullins)  "therapy"
 1960:  Henry Feldman "eudaemonic"
 1963:  Glen Van Slyke III "equipage"
 1994:  Ned Andrews "antediluvian"

See also

 List of newspapers in Tennessee

References

Further reading
 Mooney, Jack (1996). A History of Tennessee Newspapers.

External links
 
 Other internet properties owned by the Knoxville News Sentinel
 Knoxville Information Guide
 Knoxville Book of Lists
 University of Tennessee sports news coverage
 From Papers to Pixels - an effort by the Knox County Public Library system to create a digital archive of the News Sentinel spanning the years 1922 to 1990

1886 establishments in Tennessee
Mass media in Knoxville, Tennessee
Newspapers published in Tennessee
Gannett publications
Daily newspapers published in the United States
Publications established in 1886